ANA Wings Co.,Ltd. (ANAウイングス株式会社 ANA Uingusu Kabushiki Kaisha) is a regional airline with its corporate headquarters at Itami Airport near Osaka, Japan and a wholly owned subsidiary of All Nippon Airways (ANA). The airline was formed on 1 October 2010 through the merger of Air Next, Air Central and Air Nippon Network.

Destinations 

ANA Wings serves the following destinations within Japan (as of October 2019):

Fleet

Current Fleet
The ANA Wings fleet consists of the following aircraft (as of October 2022):

Former fleet

References

External links

  

All Nippon Airways
Airline companies based in Tokyo
Regional airlines of Japan
Airlines established in 2010
Japanese companies established in 2010
Star Alliance affiliate members